The New Zealand Shooting Federation (NZSF) is the governing body for Target Shooting Sports in New Zealand. It holds responsibility for selecting and developing national teams for World Championships, as well as the Olympic and Commonwealth Games.

Background

The Federation acts as an umbrella, with clubs and participants affiliating via four associations:

 National Rifle Association of New Zealand (Fullbore Rifle)
 New Zealand Clay Target Association
 Pistol New Zealand
 Target Shooting New Zealand (Smallbore and Air Rifle)

On behalf of those organisations, the Federation serves as the representative to Sport New Zealand, the New Zealand Olympic Committee and the International Shooting Sport Federation.

Performance at Competition
Shooting ha been one of New Zealand's most successful sports at the Commonwealth Games. At the 1998 Games in Kuala Luumpur, shooting was the highest performing New Zealand sport, winning eight medals including one gold. Pistol shooter Greg Yelavich is New Zealand's most medalled Commonwealth Games athlete, having won 12 medals between 1986 and 2010.

1998 Commonwealth Games 
 Desmond Coe, Bronze − Men's Trap
 Tania Corrigan, Bronze − Women's 10M Air Pistol
 Sally Johnston, Bronze − Women's 50M Prone Rifle
 Tania Corrigan and Jocelyn Lees, Silver − Women's 10M Air Pistol (Pairs); Silver - Women's 25M Sport Pistol (Pairs)
 Stephen Petterson, Gold − Men's 50M Rifle Prone
 Jason Wakeling and Alan Earle − Silver, Men's 25M Rapid Fire Pistol (Pairs)
 Greg Yelavich, Bronze − Men's 10M Air Pistol

2006 Commonwealth Games 
 Teresa Borrell and Nadine Stanton, Bronze − Women's Trap (Pairs)
 Graeme Ede, Gold − Men's Trap
 Juliet Etherington, Silver − Women's 50M Prone Rifle
 Juliet Etherington and Kathryn Mead, Bronze − Women's 50M Prone Rifle (Pairs)
 Gregory Yelavich, Silver − Men's 25M Centre Fire Pistol

2014 Commonwealth Games 
 Sally Johnston, Gold − Women's 50M Prone Rifle

2016 Summer Olympics 
 Natalie Rooney, Silver − Women's Trap

References

External links

Sports governing bodies in New Zealand
Rifle associations
Shooting sports organizations
National members of the Oceania Shooting Federation